Stathmostelma is a genus of plants in the family Apocynaceae, first described as a genus in 1893. It is native to Africa.

Species

formerly included

References

Asclepiadoideae
Apocynaceae genera